Âme is a German house/techno duo consisting of Kristian Beyer and . The duo started making tracks in 2001. Beyer and Wiedemann first met in 2000 in Beyer's record shop in their hometown of Karlsruhe. As they both liked Chicago house and Detroit techno, they started to produce music together. Âme has released music for record labels such as Ostgut Ton and Sonar Kollektiv.

Together with Dixon they own and manage the record label Innervisions in Berlin, Germany.

Âme were Mixmag magazine's "Duo of the Year" in 2006.

Selected discography
Source:

Innervisions
The Witness EP
Dream House LP
Tatischeff EP
Âme Live EP
Âme & Amampondo – Ku Kanjani EP
Rrose Sélavy / Junggesellenmaschine
A Critical Mass Live EP (with Henrik Schwarz, Dixon)
Setsa / Ensor EP
D.P.O.M.B. EP (with Henrik Schwarz, Dixon)
Balandine EP
Where We At EP (with Derrick Carter, Henrik Schwarz, Dixon)
Rej EP

Ostgut Ton
Fiori

Rush Hour
Erkki

Sonar Kollektiv
Kuma / Engoli
ÂmeCD
Mifune / Shiro 
Ojomo / Nia
Sarari / Hydrolic Dog

Exclusive tracks
Âme – "Life Changes"
Âme – "Tonite"

Remixes (incomplete)
Franz Ferdinand – "Feel The Love Go" (Âme Remix)
Moderat – "Running" (Âme Remix)
Howling – "Howling" (Âme Remix)
Osunlade – "Envision" (Âme Remix)
The xx – "Reunion" (Âme Remix)
Sailor & I – "Turn Around" (Âme Remix)
Wahoo – "Holding You" (Âme Remix)
Jazzanova – "Glow and Glare" (Âme Remix)

References

German house music groups
German musical duos
German techno music groups